Beur sur la ville is a 2011 French comedy directed by Djamel Bensalah.

Plot 

Khalid Belkacem is a young Frenchman of Maghrebi origin who has failed all his graduation exams. However, he discovers that he still has one unlikely opportunity left: joining the police force. As a police officer, he teams up with Mamadou, a black man, and Henri, an Asian, and together, they have to take down a serial killer who strikes every Friday in their banlieue.

Cast

 Booder as Khalid Belkacem
 Issa Doumbia as Koulibali
 Steve Tran as Tong
 Sandrine Kiberlain as Diane
 Josiane Balasko as Mamie Nova
 Gérard Jugnot as Gassier
 Éva Darlan as Mme Gassier
 Roland Giraud as Prefect Flaubert
 François-Xavier Demaison as Picolini
 Julie de Bona as Alice Gassier
 Biyouna as Khalid's mother
 Mohamed Benyamna as Khalid's father
 Pierre Ménès as Pierrot
 Khalid Maadour as José Da Silva
 Sacha Bourdo as Trouduk
 Chloé Coulloud as Priscilla
 Yves Rénier as Captain Jancovic
 Paul Belmondo as Lieutenant Liotey
 Julien Courbey as Lieutenant Juju
 David Saracino as Lieutenant Fabiani
 Rodolphe Brazy as Lieutenant Patrick
 Samy Seghir as Police trainee
 Valérie Lemercier as Stadium announcer
 Jean-Claude Van Damme as Colonel
 Jacques Boudet as Minister
 Lionel Abelanski as Forensic doctor
 Marilou Berry as The girl with the broken teeth 
 Frédérique Bel as The blond
 Mokobé as The paramedic
 Ramzy Bedia as Paki
 Frédéric Beigbeder as Mercedes 600 driver
 Serra Yılmaz as Nurse
 Pape Diouf as Journalist

References

External links

2011 films
2011 comedy films
French comedy films
2010s French-language films
2010s French films